Ernest Hunter Wright (1882–1968) was a professor at Columbia University, a chairman of English Institute at Columbia (1942–1946), an author of many notable works, an editor-in-chief of Richards Cyclopedia for Juveniles. Dr Wright specialized in the 18th century, Shakespeare and Rousseau.

Notable works 
 The Meaning of Rousseau
 The Authorship of Timon of Athens

Chess 
According to Jose Capablanca's "A Primer of Chess", Wright was an avid chess player. Capablanca gives Dr Wright credits for the book.

Personal life 
Wright was born in Lynchburg, Virginia in 1882. Wright graduated from Columbia University in 1906 and received his Ph.D from the University in 1910. Dr. Wright died in 1968 and was buried in Fantinekill Cemetery

References 

Columbia University alumni
Columbia University faculty
People from Manhattan
1880s births
1968 deaths